Arctornis ecnomoda is a moth of the family Erebidae first described by Charles Swinhoe in 1907. It is found south-eastern Asia, Sundaland and the Philippines.

The larvae have been reared on Durio species (durian).

External links

Lymantriinae
Moths described in 1907